Krzysztof Budka (born 2 September 1958) is a Polish footballer. He played in three matches for the Poland national football team in 1989.

References

External links
 
 

1958 births
Living people
Polish footballers
Poland international footballers
Footballers from Kraków
Association football defenders
Wisła Kraków players
Zagłębie Lubin players
Legia Warsaw players